Martin Maslin (born 14 March 1942) is a former English cricketer. Maslin was a right-handed batsman who bowled both leg break and right-arm medium pace. The son of Lincolnshire cricketer Norman Maslin, he was born in Grimsby, Lincolnshire and educated at Haileybury and Imperial Service College, where he represented the college cricket team.

Maslin made his debut for Lincolnshire against Shropshire in the 1961 Minor Counties Championship. He played Minor counties cricket for Lincolnshire from 1961 to 1980, making 109 Minor Counties Championship appearances. He made his List A debut against Hampshire in the 1966 Gillette Cup. He made 6 further List A appearances for Lincolnshire, the last of which came against Derbyshire in the 1976 Gillette Cup. In his 4 List A matches for Lincolnshire, he scored 164 runs at an average of 32.80, with a high score of 62 not out. This score, which was his only List A fifty for Lincolnshire, came against Glamorgan in the 1974 Gillette Cup. With the ball, he took 4 wickets at a bowling average of 39.50, with best figures of 3/29.

He also played first-class cricket for the Minor Counties, making his debut against the touring Pakistanis in 1967. He made 4 further first-class appearances for the team, the last of which came against the touring Pakistanis in 1974. In his 5 first-class matches, he scored 274 runs at an average of 30.44, with a high score of 66 not out. This score came against the Pakistanis in 1967. He also played List A cricket for Minor Counties North, making his debut for the team against Nottinghamshire in the 1972 Benson & Hedges Cup. He made 12 further List A appearances for the team, the last of which came against Nottinghamshire in the 1975 Benson & Hedges Cup. In his 13 matches for the team, he scored 195 runs at an average of 15.00, with a high score of 47. With the ball, he took 6 wickets at an average of 25.50, with best figures of 3/33. He additionally played List A cricket for Minor Counties East, who he made his debut for against Nottinghamshire in the 1976 Benson & Hedges Cup. He made 3 further appearances for Minor Counties East, the last of which came against Northamptonshire in the same competition. In his 4 matches for the team, he scored 125 runs at an average of 41.66, with a high score of 103 not out. This score came on debut for Minor Counties East against Nottinghamshire. With the ball, he took 2 wickets for Minor Counties East, which came at an average of 83.00, with best figures of 1/24.

References

External links
Martin Maslin at ESPNcricinfo
Martin Maslin at CricketArchive

1942 births
Living people
Cricketers from Grimsby
People educated at Haileybury and Imperial Service College
English cricketers
Lincolnshire cricketers
Minor Counties cricketers